WFAI can refer to:

 Women's Football Association of Ireland
 WXCY (AM), a radio station (1510 AM) licensed to serve Salem, New Jersey, United States, which held the call sign WFAI from 2001 to 2019
 WFAY, an AM radio station located in Fayetteville, North Carolina, formerly known as WFAI